Horn is an unincorporated community in Dawes County, Nebraska, United States.

History
Horn was formerly called Remington. It was located on the Chicago, Burlington and Quincy Railroad.

References

Unincorporated communities in Dawes County, Nebraska
Unincorporated communities in Nebraska